Patamata is an affluent suburban in centre part of Vijayawada, Andhra Pradesh, India. It is one of the most expensive commercial and residential locations in Vijayawada. The area contains shopping malls and jewellery shops. It has become a major transit point for traffic because it lies between Benz Circle and Auto Nagar. It falls under the 12th ward of Vijayawada Municipal Corporation and the present corporator is Sambaiah. It is an unreserved ward for women candidates.

Transport

References 

Neighbourhoods in Vijayawada